Florian Bianchini (born 25 June 2001) is a French professional footballer who plays as a forward for  club Châteauroux on loan from Amiens.

Club career
Bianchini made his professional debut with Amiens in a 0–0 Ligue 2 tie with LB Châteauroux on 19 September 2020.

On 1 September 2022, Bianchini was loaned by Châteauroux.

Personal life
Bianchini is of Corsican descent through his grandfather.

References

External links
 
 

2001 births
French people of Corsican descent
Sportspeople from Reims
Footballers from Grand Est
Living people
French footballers
France youth international footballers
Association football forwards
Amiens SC players
US Avranches players
LB Châteauroux players
Ligue 2 players
Championnat National players
Championnat National 3 players